Qosira (also Romanized as Qoşīrā and Qoşeyrā; also known asKasīreh, Qasreh, and Qaşr-e Seyyedhā) is a village in Kavar Rural District, in the Central District of Kavar County, Fars Province, Iran. At the 2006 census, its population was 525, in 120 families.

References 

Populated places in Kavar County